The Musée Grobet-Labadié is a museum in Marseilles, housed in a 19th-century hôtel particulier owned by the family whose collection it displays. 

In 1919, Marie Grobet, daughter of the Marseilles businessman and politician , gave the family art collection and hôtel particulier to the city.

External links
 

Art museums and galleries in France
Museums in Marseille
FRAME Museums
Art museums established in 1919
Musee Grobet-Labadié